The 1984 Atlanta Braves season was the 19th season in Atlanta along with the 114th overall.

Offseason
 October 4, 1983: Tommy Boggs was released by the Braves.
 October 21, 1983: Brett Butler, Brook Jacoby, and Rick Behenna were sent by the Braves to the Cleveland Indians to complete an earlier deal (the Braves traded players to be named later to the Indians for Len Barker) made on August 28, 1983.

Regular season

The 1984 Braves third season with Joe Torre at the helm was a disappointing one. Despite a winning record throughout most of the season they finished the campaign with an 80-82 mark, tied for second with the Houston Astros, 12 games behind the San Diego Padres.

Atlanta stumbled out of the gate with a 2-7 mark on April 13, and were six games out of first place. The Braves had a 6-11 record on April 25 but won three in a row and later won eight of nine to go above the .500 mark for the first time in 1984. They were 18-15 on May 13, tied for third and two games out of first.

On May 24 Atlanta lost a double-header to the Cubs 10-7, 7-5 to drop to the .500 mark at 21-21. Atlanta rebounded to win 13 of its next 15 games to surge into first place with a 34-23 mark on June 7.
The Braves were 32-16 since April 14 and were in first place by 1½ games. The season was beginning to look good for Atlanta.

Unfortunately for the Braves this would prove to be the high water mark for the season. Atlanta lost five in a row from June 8 to 12 to fall into second place, 3½ games out of first. They were never to be in first place again in 1984.

June 16, 1984: The Braves were playing the Cincinnati Reds in Atlanta.  Mario Soto threw several brushback pitches at Braves slugger Claudell Washington.  Washington tossed his bat in the direction of Soto, appeared to go out to retrieve it, but instead walked toward the mound.  Umpire Lanny Harris attempted to restrain Washington.  Harris was thrown to the ground.  Soto used the distraction to punch Washington.  Several of Washington's teammates attempted to hold Washington to the ground.  While they were doing that, Soto fired the baseball into the crowd of players, striking Braves coach Joe Pignatano.  He was suspended three games for this incident; Washington received a five-game suspension for shoving (umpire) Lanny Harris. (Both Soto and Washington were ejected from the game.)

On June 20 the Braves were 39-29 and in second place, 1½ games out of first. By the end of June they were 43-35 and three games out of first. July would prove to be tougher for the Braves however. Atlanta went 5-12 to begin the month of July. On July 19 the Braves owned a 48-47 record and were seven games out of first and still in second place. It was growing more obvious that this wouldn't be the magical season fans had wished it would be. Atlanta was 8½ games out of first on the last day of July.

On  August 3 the Braves were six games over the .500 mark with a 57-51 record  following a 2-1 win over the Giants. The league leading San Diego Padres lost that day and the Braves closed within 7½ games of the lead. The Braves were still hopeful of a late season surge but it appeared that might not happen.

After August 3 things turned rotten on the Braves.  From August 4 to September 9 the Braves  posted a 12-23 record that reduced them to 69-74 with an eleven-game deficit with 19 games to play. The Braves had also slipped to third place. The "pennant race" was over.

Season standings

Record vs. opponents

Notable transactions
 April 24, 1984: Biff Pocoroba was released by the Braves.
 June 4, 1984: Tom Glavine was drafted by the Braves in the 2nd round of the 1984 Major League Baseball draft.
 June 15, 1984: Ken Dayley and Mike Jorgensen were traded by the Braves to the St. Louis Cardinals for Ken Oberkfell.

Roster

Player stats

Batting

Starters by position
Note: Pos = Position; G = Games played; AB = At bats; H = Hits; Avg. = Batting average; HR = Home runs; RBI = Runs batted in

Other batters
Note: G = Games played; AB = At bats; H = Hits; Avg. = Batting average; HR = Home runs; RBI = Runs batted in

Pitching

Starting pitchers
Note: G = Games pitched; IP = Innings pitched; W = Wins; L = Losses; ERA = Earned run average; SO = Strikeouts

Other pitchers
Note" G = Games pitched; IP = Innings pitched; W = Wins; L = Losses; ERA = Earned run average; SO = Strikeouts

Relief pitchers
Note: G = Games pitched; W = Wins; L = Losses; SV = Saves; ERA = Earned run average; SO = Strikeouts

Farm system

See also

References

External links
1984 Atlanta Braves season at Baseball Reference

Atlanta Braves seasons
Atlanta Braves Season, 1984
Atlanta